The Mounts of Cantal (or Volcanoes of Cantal) are a mountainous massif in the mid-west of the Massif Central, France, made up of the remnants of the largest stratovolcano of Europe, which was formed from 13 million years ago and last erupted approximately 2 million years ago. However, the main part of the volcanic activity was concentrated between 8.5 and 7 million years ago. Thereafter, the original volcano was largely eroded, massive landslides occurred, and it was further eroded by glaciers and water.

Geomorphology

The stratovolcano of Cantal is the widest in Europe. Its highest point is the Plomb du Cantal, located in the eastern part of the massif. Around 20 valleys have been formed in the range, radiating out from the centre and cutting the basaltic plateau into triangular pieces called planèzes. These valleys were occupied by glaciers during the last ice age, which explains their U-shape.

Topography

Main summits
 
The mounts of the Cantal are composed of several summits, the best known being:
 Puy Mary, which offers a beautiful panorama from its summit;
 Plomb du Cantal, accessible from the ski resort of Super Lioran and from the pass of Prat-de-Bouc;
 Puy Griou;
 Puy Chavaroche;
 Puy de Peyre-Arse, offering a magnificent panorama of the glacial valleys of Santoire and Impradine;
 Puy de Seycheuse, which offers a panorama of the glacial cirque of Santoire and the valley of Alagnon.

Economy

The major part of the economy is concentrated in the agriculture and in particular cattle farming. The local breed of cattle is the Salers cattle, raised for its meat and for its milk (to make Cantal cheese and Salers cheese).

Besides this, there is a winter sports industry in le Lioran, the largest ski resort of the Massif Central.

References

 
Stratovolcanoes of Metropolitan France
Miocene stratovolcanoes
Pliocene stratovolcanoes
Pleistocene stratovolcanoes